Karel Rupel also Karlo Rupel (5 December 1907 in Trieste – 17 September 1968 in Ljubljana) was a Slovenian violinist and professor of the Ljubljana Academy of Music.

References

1907 births
1968 deaths
Slovenian violinists
Male violinists
Academic staff of the University of Ljubljana
20th-century violinists
20th-century male musicians